Fazenda São Mateus Biological Reserve was a biological reserve in Minas Gerais, Brazil.

History

An audit in 2012, stated that a number of biological reserves created in 1974 on state-owned land were being re-assessed, since they no longer qualified as conservation units.
These were Fazenda São Mateus, Carmo da Mata, Colônia 31 de Março and others.
As of 2016, the reserve did not appear on the list of biological reserves in the state.

Notes

Sources

1974 establishments in Brazil
Biological reserves of Brazil
Protected areas of Minas Gerais
Protected areas established in 1974
Protected areas of the Atlantic Forest